Gondelsheim is a municipality in Northern Karlsruhe district in Baden-Württemberg, Germany. It is located on Bertha Benz Memorial Route 3 km northwest of Bretten and shares a direct border with that city.

Sights are the gothic-revival castle with the Old Tower and a replica of the Three Dancing Maidens fountain. The castle was inherited by Countess Louise von Langenstein und Gondelsheim, an illegitimate daughter of Louis I, Grand Duke of Baden, who in 1848 married the Swedish Count Carl Israel Wilhelm Douglas (1824–1898). Count Ludwig Wilhelm August von Langenstein and Gondelsheim had today's palace built in 1857. The Douglas family, living in Langenstein Castle, sold it in 2010.

References

Karlsruhe (district)